Ashley Kelly may refer to:
Ashley Kelly (footballer), English footballer
Ashley Kelly (gymnast), American gymnast
Ashley Kelly (sprinter), British Virgin Islander sprinter
Ashley Callie, South African actress